Silberzacken, also known as East Peak, is a  high subsidiary peak of Nanga Parbat in the Himalayan Range in Pakistan.

Location and layout
Silberzacken is located on a ridge in Himalayan Range, south of the Indus River in the Diamer District of Gilgit–Baltistan in Pakistan. The ridge has three faces; Diamir, Rakhiot, and Rupal. The south and southeast side of the mountain is dominated by the Rupal face, while the north and northwest side of the mountain is split into Diamir face in the west and Rakhiot face in the north.

See also
List of Mountains in Pakistan

References 

Seven-thousanders of the Himalayas
Mountains of Gilgit-Baltistan